Bethany Ashram , Perunadu ,  Ranni  is the first Ashram of the Malankara Orthodox Syrian Church . It was established by P.T.Geevarghese, later Archbishop Ivanios and Alexios, later Alexios Thevodosios. The Ashram follows the religious order called Order of the Imitation of Christ (O.I.C.).

Foundation of the ashram 
At Serampore, P.T. Geevarghese had more time for prayer and contemplation. He came across the writings of St. Basil on monasticism. The Basilian monastic vision had a great influence on him. Besides the visits to the Sabarmati Ashram of Mahatma Gandhi and Santiniketan of Rabindranath Tagore gave him a new vision of Indian Sannyasa (monasticism). These experiences made him reflect upon starting an order of missionaries to carry out the task of evangelisation in India. Slowly the residence of P.T. Geevarghese and his followers at Serampore became an Ashram (monastery), and they began to live a sort of religious life according to the monastic rules of St. Basil, adapting them to Indian culture. As he accepted this as his way of life, he resigned from the Serampore College.

On his return from Calcutta, Geevarghese looked for a location to establish an ashram. One of his friends, Advocate E. J. John, donated  of land at Mundanmala, Ranni-Perunadu, Kerala at the meeting place of the rivers Pampa and Kakkatt. The place was thickly filled with thorny bushes and herbs. In 1918 Fr. Alexios along with Oomman Vadhyar reached Mundanmala and made the necessary arrangements to establish the Asramam and started an orphanage at there as part of the Bethany Asramam's social activities.Later in 1919 Fr P T Geevarghese joined at Mundanmala.

P.T. Geevarghese founded the Bethany Madhom for religious women in 1925, with the help of the Anglican sisters, entitled Oxford Mission Sisterhood of the Epiphany working at Serampore.

Bishop of Bethany 
The Malankara Synod decided to ordain P.T. Geevarghese bishop of Bethany. He was ordained by Baselios Geevarghese I on 1 May 1925. He received the name Mar Ivanios. 

Bishop Mar Ivanios, one of the founder of the Bethany Asraman left the Malankara Church and the Bethany Asramam in 1930 joined Roman Catholic Church. Fr.Alexios became the superior of the Aramam in 1930.

References

Christian organisations based in India
Syro-Malankara Catholic Church
Christian organizations established in 1919